John Dagleish is a British actor originally from Essex, known for his work in theatre.

In 2008 to 2011, John Dagleish played Alf Arless in the Lark Rise to Candleford series on BBC. In 2014, he played Ray Davies as part of the original cast of Sunny Afternoon at Hampstead Theatre. The production transferred to the West End in October 2014, where Dagleish won the Laurence Olivier Award for Best Actor in a Musical for his performance. He was also nominated for the London Evening Standard emerging talent award. As part of the original cast he appeared on the original london cast album.

In 2015, he joined the Kenneth Branagh Theatre Company, appearing in productions of Harlequinade and The Winter's Tale at the Garrick Theatre In 2016 he played Lysander in A Midsummer Night's Dream at the Young Vic. In May 2017 he appeared in Common at the Royal National Theatre. Later that year, he appeared in Justice League.

In 2018 in the film Christopher Robin, he plays the role of Matthew Leadbetter.

Filmography

Film

Television

Video games

References

External links

British male musical theatre actors
Laurence Olivier Award winners
Living people
Year of birth missing (living people)